Bheri Zone was one of the fourteen zones of Nepal, comprising five districts, namely, Banke, Bardiya, Dailekh, Jajarkot and Surkhet. Here is district wise List of Monuments which are in the Bheri Zone.

Lists of monuments
 List of monuments in Banke District 
 List of monuments in Bardiya District 
 List of monuments in Dailekh District 
 List of monuments in Jajarkot District
 List of monuments in Surkhet District

References

Bheri Zone
Bheri Zone